Khomeh Olya (also Romanized as Khomeh Olya and Khomeh-ye ‘Olyā; also known as Khvomeh-ye Bālā, Khomeh Bālā, Khomeh-ye Bālā, Khowmb-e Bālā, and Khumbe Bāla) is a village in Khomeh Rural District, in the Central District of Aligudarz County, Lorestan Province, Iran. At the 2006 census, its population was 755, in 149 families.

References 

Towns and villages in Aligudarz County